Seppo Mikko Sakari Honkapohja (born 7 March 1951 in Helsinki) is a Finnish economist. He is a board member of the Bank of Finland and former Professor of International Macroeconomics of the University of Cambridge.

Career 
After receiving his International Baccalaureate at the United World College of the Atlantic in Wales, Seppo Honkapohja went to the University of Helsinki to get a M.Soc.Sc., the Licentiate of Soc.Sc. and in 1979 a D.Soc.Sc.

From 1975 to 1987 Honkapohja was Scientific Director in the Yrjö Jahnsson Foundation. Until 1991 he then was Professor of Economics at the Turku School of Economics and Business Administration. In 1992 he joined the University of Helsinki as Professor of Economics. In addition he was Academy Professor of the Academy of Finland from 2000 to 2004. From 2004 until 2007 he was Professor of International Macroeconomics and fellow of Clare College, University of Cambridge. He researched on modelling of learning and expectations, bounded rationality and their implications for monetary and fiscal policy.

Since 1 January 2008, Seppo Honkapohja is a member of the board of the Finnish central bank with responsibility for research, information technology and Bank of Finland's own investments.

Honours 
 Member of the Academia Europaea (since 1990)
 Member of the Finnish Academy of Science and Letters (since 1991) and Chairman of the Social Science Group (1997–2002)
 Fellow of the Econometric Society (since 1999)
 Fellow of the European Economic Association (since 2004)
 Jaakko Honko Medal by Helsinki School of Economics and Business Administration 1998
 Doctor of Science h.c. in Economics and Business Administration, Turku School of Economics (2010)

Publications 
 List of publications at the Central Bank of Finland

References

External links 
 Who's Who 2004

1951 births
Living people
20th-century Finnish economists
Central bankers
Academics of the University of Cambridge
Academic staff of the University of Helsinki
Fellows of Clare College, Cambridge
Fellows of the Econometric Society
Members of Academia Europaea
Members of the Finnish Academy of Science and Letters
People educated at Atlantic College
People educated at a United World College
Finnish bankers
21st-century Finnish economists